Byron Hamish Black (born 6 October 1969) is a former touring professional tennis and Davis Cup player for Zimbabwe.

Personal life
He is the son of Donald Black and Velia Black and brother to Wayne Black and Cara, who were also professional tennis players. He is married to Fiona Black, and has children. He attended the University of Southern California and was named an All-American by the Intercollegiate Tennis Association (ITA).

Tennis career
Black started playing tennis at a young age at his father’s grass court in Highlands, and played the game for Lewisham Primary School in his hometown. He played for the tennis team when he moved to the Oriel Boys High School, where he was exposed to other future Davis Cup players for Zimbabwe like Greig Rodgers and Mark Gurr.

Pro tour
In 1995, Black was a US Open quarterfinalist, and in 2000, he reached the same round at Wimbledon. His career-high singles ranking was world No. 22, which he achieved in June 1996.

An accomplished doubles player, Black became world No. 1 in doubles in February 1994. He won the 1994 French Open partnering Jonathan Stark. Black was a doubles finalist in three other majors, the 1994 and 2001 Australian Opens and the 1996 Wimbledon Championships.

Black is one of the few professional players to have played with a double-handed forehand.

Black formed the core of the Zimbabwe Davis Cup team with his brother Wayne.

Career finals

Doubles: 41 (22 titles, 19 runner-ups)

Singles: 10 (2 titles, 8 runner-ups)

Performance timelines

Doubles

References

External links
 
 
 

1969 births
Living people
Sportspeople from Harare
Zimbabwean male tennis players
Olympic tennis players of Zimbabwe
French Open champions
Tennis players at the 1996 Summer Olympics
USC Trojans men's tennis players
White Zimbabwean sportspeople
Grand Slam (tennis) champions in men's doubles
Zimbabwean people of English descent
Zimbabwean people of Scottish descent
African Games medalists in tennis
African Games gold medalists for Zimbabwe
Competitors at the 1987 All-Africa Games
ATP number 1 ranked doubles tennis players